Pheidole pegasus is a species of ant in the genus Pheidole. It was discovered and described by Sarnat, E. M. in 2008.

References

pegasus
Insects described in 2008